19 [Solo] Compositions, 1988 is a live album by composer and saxophonist Anthony Braxton featuring solo performances recorded in 1988 and released on the New Albion label.

Reception

The Allmusic review by Scott Yanow stated:

Track listing
All compositions by Anthony Braxton except where noted.

 "138A (ballade)" - 2:57
 "106D (relationship)" - 3:25
 "118F (buzz logic)" - 2:46
 "138B (african violets)" 	2:26
 "77G (whole)" - 3:14
 "118A (intervallic)" - 3:17
 "138C (long)" - 2:25
 "106J (pointillistic)" - 2:40
 "77C (triplet diatonic)" - 3:05
 "26F (104/M kelvin)" - 1:50
 "You Go to My Head" (J. Fred Coots, Haven Gillespie) - 4:17
 "119I (+99E) (medium dance)" - 1:47
 "119G (multiphonic)" - 1:58
 "Round 'Bout Midnight" (Thelonious Monk, Cootie Williams, Bernie Hanighen) - 2:44
 "99B (line)" - 3:47
 "106A (quarter)" - 2:56
 "138D (ballade)" - 2:17
 "Half Nelson" (Miles Davis) - 5:10
 "106C (triadic spiral)" - 3:04

Recorded at Killian Hall, Massachusetts Institute of Technology in Cambridge, Massachusetts on April 8, 1988 (tracks 1-16) and Intersection for the Arts in San Francisco, CA on April 16, 1988 (tracks 17-19)

Personnel
Anthony Braxton - alto saxophone

References

Anthony Braxton live albums
1989 live albums